is an racing simulation game released by Namco for arcades in 1990. It is the arcade sequel to Final Lap and runs on Namco System 2 hardware.

Gameplay
Much like the original title (and Four Trax), it allows up to eight players to play simultaneously when four two-player sit-down cabinets are connected together, but this one features four different tracks which are set in the game's home country of Japan (the Suzuka Circuit from the original), Italy, Monaco, and the United States (which resembles the Test track that was featured in Pole Position II). For a second time, the players must take control of either the Williams, McLaren, March or Lotus cars, which have been redesigned, in a Formula One race on one of the four tracks - and in the single-player mode, the player's score shall again be based upon how far his car travels until the timer runs out or he completes four laps of the chosen circuit, and hitting another car or a billboard will again not cause a player car to explode like it did in the two Pole Position games, but it can still send it (or the other car) spinning off the track, costing valuable time. In the multiplayer mode, up to eight players can again race simultaneously; this shall again allow for better lap times, as the plain green CPU-controlled cars (which have also been redesigned) shall appear less frequently. The United States track is the easiest of the four, and is recommended for the novice players - and once a player has mastered it, he is ready to move on to the Monaco track, then the Italy one (which are of medium and medium-hard difficulties). However, the Japan track is the most difficult one, given that it is the Suzuka Circuit from the original game and it is therefore only recommended for the expert players or the players who had managed to master it in the original.

Reception
In Japan, the arcade magazine Game Machine reported that Final Lap 2 was  the top-earning upright/cockpit arcade game of September 1990. It went on to be Japan's highest-grossing dedicated arcade cabinet of 1991, and third highest-grossing overall arcade game of the year (below Street Fighter II and Final Fight). Final Lap 2 was then Japan's second highest-grossing arcade game of 1992, again below Street Fighter II.

In North America, it was the top-grossing new video game on the RePlay arcade charts in May 1991, and was then the top-grossing upright cabinet from June to July 1991. It was awarded the Silver Award at the 1992 American Amusement Machine Association (AAMA) tradeshow for sales excellence in 1991; it was one of five arcade video games at the show to receive a Silver Award or higher. It also topped the RePlay deluxe cabinet chart in March 1992.

Mark Caswell of Crash magazine gave it a positive review, calling it a good racing game and noting it "is one of the only racing games I know of where you MUST brake when approaching a corner and this realism is well appreciated."

Notes

References

External links

Final Lap 2 at the Arcade History database

1990 video games
Arcade video games
Arcade-only video games
Formula One video games
Multiplayer and single-player video games
Namco arcade games
Racing video games
Racing video games set in the United States
Sports video games set in Italy
Video game sequels
Video games developed in Japan
Video games scored by Shinji Hosoe
Video games set in Monaco
Video games set in Japan